Tateno Dam  is a gravity dam located in Kumamoto Prefecture in Japan. The dam is used for flood control. The catchment area of the dam is 383 km2. The dam impounds about 36  ha of land when full and can store 10100 thousand cubic meters of water. The construction of the dam was started on 1979.

See also
List of dams in Japan

References

Dams in Kumamoto Prefecture